The 1988 UTEP Miners football team was an American football team that represented the University of Texas at El Paso as a member of the Western Athletic Conference (WAC) during the 1988 NCAA Division I-A football season. In its third season under head coach Bob Stull, the team compiled a 10–3 record (6–2 against WAC opponents), finished second in the conference, lost to Southern Miss in the 1988 Independence Bowl, and outscored all opponents by a total of 445 to 275.

Schedule

References

UTEP
UTEP Miners football seasons
UTEP Miners football